The 1904–05 Football League season was Small Heath Football Club's 13th in the Football League and their 5th in the First Division. In third position in the 18-team league, only one point behind the leaders, with eight matches remaining, they gained only four points from the sixteen available, and finished seventh. They also took part in the 1904–05 FA Cup, entering at the first round proper and losing to Portsmouth in that round. In locally organised competition, they won the Birmingham Senior Cup for the first time, defeating West Bromwich Albion by seven goals to two. After this season, the club entered a primarily reserve team for this competition, which had previously not been permitted.

Nineteen players made at least one appearance in nationally organised first-team competition, and there were nine different goalscorers. Goalkeeper Nat Robinson, full-back Frank Stokes and forward Benny Green were all ever-present over the 35-match season. Billy Jones was leading scorer with 16 goals, all of which came in the league.

At an Extraordinary General Meeting held in March 1905, it was proposed that, Small Heath being the only major football club in the city since Birmingham St George's had folded in 1892, the club should be renamed Birmingham City F.C. The shareholders were not in favour, though they were prepared to go as far as plain Birmingham Football Club instead. Even this was a step too far for some; one reporter referred to "the Small Heath club now masquerading as Birmingham".

Events surrounding the February 1905 match with Aston Villa highlighted the Coventry Road ground's inadequacies. The official attendance was given as 28,000, though with the gates closed before kick-off, thousands scaled walls or forced entrances in order to gain admission, and the actual attendance was estimated at anything up to 35,000. The Birmingham Daily Mail reported "a constant stream of vehicles to the ground, while the trams were disgorging their freights at Muntz Street every two or three minutes." Inside, "the swaying of the mass of spectators rendered the placing of additional supports against the barriers a necessary precaution", and children were passed overhead and placed on the pitch for their own safety. The following Monday the same newspaper commented that had space been available, another ten or fifteen thousand spectators might well have attended, as "hundreds of people found the doors closed against them, and probably there were thousands who would not go to the ground in view of the inevitable crush." The club's landlords would neither sell the freehold of the ground nor allow its expansion, so the directors began planning to move to a new home.

Football League First Division

League table (part)

FA Cup

Appearances and goals

See also
Birmingham City F.C. seasons

References
General
 Matthews, Tony (1995). Birmingham City: A Complete Record. Breedon Books (Derby). .
 Matthews, Tony (2010). Birmingham City: The Complete Record. DB Publishing (Derby). .
 Source for match dates and results: "Birmingham City 1904–1905: Results". Statto Organisation. Retrieved 22 May 2012.
 Source for lineups, appearances, goalscorers and attendances: Matthews (2010), Complete Record, pp. 254–55. Note that attendance figures are estimated.
 Source for kit: "Birmingham City". Historical Football Kits. Retrieved 22 May 2018.

Specific

Birmingham City F.C. seasons
Small Heath